Nicole Brown (born 1976) is an Austrian and British writer and academic whose expertise lies with social research practice. She focuses on the development and pragmatics of research methods and approaches for data analysis as well as dissemination.

Education 
Brown has a teaching qualification (2001), a Magister degree from the University of Vienna (2001), a master's degree in teaching from the UCL Institute of Education (2006), a diploma in translation from the University of London (2008). She has a 2018 postgraduate certificate in higher education, a 2020 masters degree in higher education, and a PhD in sociology, all from the University of Kent.

Career 
Associate Professor and IOE Head of Research Ethics and Integrity at University College London, and Director of Social Research & Practice and Education Ltd.

Brown researches physical and material representations of experiences, the generation of knowledge and use of metaphors to express what is difficult to express, and more generally, research methods and approaches to explore identity and body work.

Brown is an editor for the Journal of Participatory Research Methods, Disability and Society, and The Qualitative Report.

Publications

Books 

 Brown, N., Ince, A. & Ramlackhan, K. (eds.). (to be published in 2024). Creativity in Education: International Perspectives. UCL Press.
 Brown, N. (November 2023). Photovoice, Reimagined. Policy Press. ISBN 9781447369387.
 Brown, N. (2021). Making the Most of Your Research Journal. Bristol: Policy Press. ISBN 9781447360049.
 Leigh, J. S. & Brown, N. (2021). Embodied Inquiry: Research Methods. Bloomsbury. ISBN 9781350118799.
 Brown, N. (ed.) (2021). Lived Experiences of Ableism in Academia: Strategies for Inclusion in Higher Education. Bristol: Policy Press. 
 Brown, N. & Leigh, J. S. (eds.) (2020). Ableism in Academia: Theorising Experiences of Disabilities and Chronic Illnesses in Higher Education. London: UCL Press.

Awards and honors 

 A 2016 winner of the Turnitin Global innovation Awards
 A 2018 Postgraduate Festival Prize Winner from the University of Kent
 In 2022, admitted as Fellow to the Royal Society of Arts

References

External links 

 November 2020 podcast: "Podcast Participatory Research Methods with Identity Boxes, Photographs and Legos" on the NVivo Podcast – Between the Data.
 March 2021 video interview: "Choosing creative methods: Conversation with Nicole Brown" on Methodspace
 March 2021 podcast: "Reflective journalling for the PhD process with Nicole Brown" on the PhD Life Raft podcast
 November 2021 article: "Keeping a research journal that works for you" on the LSE Impact Blog.
 April 2022 blog post: "5 ways to become an innovator in higher education" in Times Higher Education Campus.

Living people
1976 births
People from Leoben
Academic staff of University College London Australia
21st-century Australian women writers
21st-century British women writers
Austrian academics
British academics
Austrian editors
British editors
Austrian emigrants to the United Kingdom
Women editors
Women academics
Alumni of the University of Kent
University of Vienna alumni
Alumni of the University of London
Alumni of University College London
Research methods